Syarwan Hamid (10 November 1943 – 25 March 2021) was an Indonesian military officer and politician.

He served as Minister of Internal Affairs from 1998 to 1999, in the Development Reform Cabinet under President B. J. Habibie.

Hamid died on 25 March 2021.

References

1943 births
2021 deaths
Indonesian politicians 
People from Riau